This is a list of major South Island, New Zealand based companies. To qualify a company must 1) have its registered office in the South Island; 2) a majority of its shareholders (51% or greater) must reside in the South Island; and 3) it must be listed on the NZX, NZAX or the Deloitte South Island Index and have an annual revenue of greater than NZ$100 million.

See also
List of companies of New Zealand

External links
Deloitte South Island Index

 
South Island